Séamus Mac Gearailt (born 1945), sometimes referred to as Séamus Fitzgerald, is an Irish retired Gaelic football trainer, coach, selector and former player. His league and championship career with the Kerry senior team spanned twelve seasons from 1963 to 1974.

Biography

Mac Gearailt made his debut on the inter-county scene at the age of sixteen when he was selected as the goalkeeper for the Kerry minor team. He enjoyed two championship seasons with the minor team, winning back-to-back All0Ireland medals in 1962 and 1963. Mac Gearailt subsequently joined the Kerry under-21 team, winning an All-Ireland medal in this grade in 1965. By this stage he had also joined the Kerry senior team, making his debut during the 1962-63 league. Over the course of the next twelve seasons, Mac Gearailt won back-to-back All-Ireland medals in 1969 and 1970. He also won five Munster medals and six National Football League medals. He played his last game for Kerry in July 1974.

After being chosen on the Munster inter-provincial team for the first time in 1964, Mac Gearailt remained off the team until the twilight of his career. As a member of the starting fifteen in 1971 and 1972 he won one Railway Cup medal.

In retirement from playing, Mac Gearailt became involved in team management and coaching. In 1975 he trained the Kerry minor team to the All-Ireland title. He later served as coach and selector with the Kerry under-21 team, helping the team to an All-Ireland title in 1994. As part of Páidí Ó Sé's management team with the Kerry senior footballers, Mac Gearilt helped the team to the All-Ireland title in 1997.

Honours

Player

Kerry
All-Ireland Senior Football Championship (2): 1969, 1970
Munster Senior Football Championship (5): 1964, 1968, 1969, 1970, 1972
National Football League (6): 1962-63, 1968-69, 1970-71, 1971-72, 1972-73, 1973-74

Munster
Railway Cup (1): 1972

Coach

Kerry
All-Ireland Senior Football Championship (1): 1997
Munster Senior Football Championship (5): 1996, 1997, 1998
National Football League (1): 1996-97

References

1945 births
20th-century Irish people
21st-century Irish people
Living people
An Ghaeltacht Gaelic footballers
Kerry inter-county Gaelic footballers
Munster inter-provincial Gaelic footballers
Winners of two All-Ireland medals (Gaelic football)